Lucija Bešen (born 29 March 1998) is a Croatian handballer for RK Podravka Koprivnica and the Croatian national team.

She represented Croatia at the 2020 European Women's Handball Championship.

Her older sister Gabrijela Bartulović (née Bešen) is also a handball player.

International honours
EHF European Cup:
Runner-up: 2021

References

External links

1998 births
Living people
Croatian female handball players
Handball players from Zagreb
Competitors at the 2022 Mediterranean Games
Mediterranean Games silver medalists for Croatia
Mediterranean Games medalists in handball
21st-century Croatian women